Ghost Online also known as Ghost Soul and GO was a free fast-paced action-based sidescrolling, massively multiplayer online game that is currently released in South Korea, Japanese, Chinese, Thailand and Malaysian-English.
On July 8, the Global version went into Open Beta, but was closed down on June 3, 2009. Created by Netgame, which is a division of MGame USA Inc.(Taiwan and China 搞鬼 is a free, 2D computer graphics, side-scrolling MMORPG developed by the Korean company MGame. Several versions of the game are available for specific countries or regions, and each is published by various companies such as GameFlier, Gemscool and OurGame. Although playing the game is free, many player appearances and gameplay enhancements can be purchased from the GhostShop using real currency.

In the game, players defend the "World" from ghost monsters and develop their character's skills and abilities, as in typical role-playing games. There is a soul system that allows players absorb souls from monsters. Players can interact with others in many ways, such as through chatting, trading.  Groups of players can band together in parties to hunt monsters, and share the rewards. Players can fight each other with the game PvP system. Players can also band in a guild to battle with other guilds. Ghost Online also many quests, some of which allow the player to obtain new skills.

Story

Lord Tai He and his apprentices rid the world of Demons, but Tai He himself had used forbidden magic that corrupted his soul. So he had to go to the western lands, to find the sacred herb to cleanse it. The player is Tai He for a short time, learning the basics in Batu Caves. After defeating a clone, Tai He eats the herb, dies and is reborn as your character.

Gameplay

There are six character classes in the game. The main source of gold (in-game currency) and experience points are the monsters in the game. They are found in most fields outside of the cities and towns, and portals leading to maps with monsters (usually from a town) are colored red.

Shutdown
As of June 3, 2009, the game was shut down (USA version), with two other games, which are The Legend of Ares and Holic online, by Mgame USA. The reason for termination was that the three games were not producing enough revenue. Ghost Online Malaysia was shut down on 31 August 2009.
The Vietnam version also shut down on January 31, 2009.
The game was re-released in June 2012, under the name Soul Saver Online with a few minor changes.

Recently, the Thailand version also shut down on March 11, 2014.

Official game websites
Official Korean Site
Official North American Site
Official Taiwan Ghost Online Website

2005 video games
Massively multiplayer online role-playing games
Video games developed in South Korea
Windows games
Online games